The 29th British Academy Scotland Awards were held on 3 November 2019 at the DoubleTree by Hilton Hotel Glasgow Central, honouring the best Scottish film and television productions of 2018. The nominations were announced by Edith Bowman on 25 September 2019.

Nominees

Outstanding Contribution to Television
The Creative Team Behind Still Game: Greg Hemphill, Ford Kiernan, Michael Hines.

Outstanding Contribution to Craft
Pat Rambaut

See also
72nd British Academy Film Awards
91st Academy Awards
25th Screen Actors Guild Awards

References

External links
BAFTA Scotland Home page

2019
2019 in British cinema
British Academy Scotland Awards
British Academy Scotland Awards
2019 in Scotland
2019 in British television
Brit
November 2019 events in the United Kingdom
2010s in Glasgow